Älvkarleby is a locality situated in Älvkarleby Municipality, Uppsala County, Sweden with 1,647 inhabitants in 2010. It is not the seat of the municipality, a function held by Skutskär 7 km to the north.

See also 
Älgen Stolta

References 

Populated places in Uppsala County
Populated places in Älvkarleby Municipality